Chah Kahnuiyeh (also Romanized as Chāh Kahnū’īyeh, Chāh-e Kahnū’īyeh, and Chāh-e Kahnūyeh; also known as Chah-i-Kahnau) is a village in Ekhtiarabad Rural District, in the Central District of Kerman County, Kerman Province, Iran. At the 2006 census, its population was 126, in 34 families.

References 

Populated places in Kerman County